is a football (soccer) club based in Hirakata, Osaka Prefecture in Japan. They currently play in the Japan Football League, the Japanese fourth tier of football league.

History 

Founded in 2004 by the will of three former Gamba Osaka players - Junichi Inamoto, Ryuji Bando and Toru Araiba -, the club was initially named FC Ibanina, a name came up with the merge of the three players' name. Then in 2006 the club was renamed FC TIAMO: ti amo stays for Italian I love you. Araiba actually remained the only one managing the new-born club, adding the suffix Hirakata only in 2015. The club won several promotions along the years and now hopes to reach Japan Football League and possibly J3 League before 2019.

In 2020 season, FC TIAMO Hirakata won the regional championship for the first time ever in their history and won promotion to the Japan Football League for the 2021 season.

The club will play their 3rd consecutive season in the Japan Football League on 2023.

League & cup record 

Key

Honours 
 Japanese Regional Football Champions League
Winners: 2020
 Kansai Soccer League Div. 1
 Winners: 2020
 Kansai Soccer League Div. 2
 Winners: 2014, 2016
 Shakaijin Cup
 Winners: 2019

Current squad 
As of 9 March 2023.

Out on loan

Coaching Staff 
As of the 2023 season

Managerial history

References

External links 
Official Site 
Official Facebook Page
Official Team Blog

Football clubs in Japan
Sports teams in Osaka Prefecture
Hirakata, Osaka
Association football clubs established in 2004
2004 establishments in Japan